The American Society of Mexico (AmSoc) is a community organization and non-profit for the greater American Community living in Mexico. The organization was established on August 26, 1942, by then-United States Ambassador George S. Messersmith and American community leaders as the American population in Mexico started to increase with the purpose to represent the American community as a whole. Messersmith became the first honorary president and all United States ambassadors have become honorary presidents of the society ever since. Over the years, the society has organized events centered around American and Mexican traditions and formed partnerships to benefit the American Community in Mexico.

History 

The American Society of Mexico was one of the first players in uniting the American Community within Mexico, helping Americans integrate within Mexico and sharing many distinctly American traditions between the American Community in Mexico and Mexicans.

The founding president was Mr. Russell Ford Moody who was born on June 13, 1902, in Michigan and received his Bachelor of Science in mechanical engineering by the University of Michigan in 1925. He was the vice president of the Canada Dry Bottling Company of Mexico, had been assistant general manager of the Compañía Hulera Euzkadi, and was alternate director of the Banco Internacional, Bank of London. He was also a board director to the American British Cowdray (ABC) Hospital, YMCA, and a standing member of the University Club, the American Club, Club de Banqueros, Masons and Tau Beta Pi. Married to Louise, he had two children: Jean Carol and Beverly.

The honorary president, George Strausser Messersmith, was born on October 3, 1883, in Fleetwood, Pennsylvania. He entered the Foreign Service and served in different countries, including Germany during World War II, where he was best known for his controversial decision to issue a visa to Albert Einstein. In Mexico Ambassador Messersmith was not only responsible for the foundation of The American Society of Mexico, but also for establishing in the same year of 1942, the well-renowned Benjamin Franklin Library in Mexico City. He was appointed the U.S. Ambassador to Mexico up until 1947 by President Harry S. Truman.

Political affiliation 
The American Society of Mexico, A.C. (AmSoc) is a non-profit, non-partisan organization established in its original charter to represent all U.S. private interests in Mexico. As a non-governmental association, the U.S. Ambassador to Mexico has always been our Honorary President, with whom the Society works closely.

Represents 
Over two million Americans living in Mexico, making this community, the largest community of men, women and children outside the United States, over one hundred and ten American established NGO’s/non-profit/civic organizations that are giving back to the Mexican communities they serve, U.S. investment in Mexico and the corporations operating there in.

Core principles 

 Improve the communities we live in and strengthen the bilateral relationship for the people of both nations.
 Promote and protect U.S. private interests, of individuals, companies, and American established NGO’s / non-profit / civic organizations.
 Advocate on behalf of Americans in Mexico and Mexicans in the United States. 
 Collaborate in the bilateral agenda set forward between both Mexico & the United States.
 Boost American events, culture and traditions in Mexico & Mexican events, culture and traditions in the U.S.

President 

Larry Rubin is the President and Chairman of the Board of The American Society of Mexico, an organization that has represented the American community and American interests in Mexico for the past 80 years. Together with the U.S. Ambassador to Mexico, the Honorary President of AmSoc, he represents the two million Americans living in Mexico and all the American companies and NGOs that are here.

In many ways, Larry’s background was tailor-made to head The American Society of Mexico. Growing up in his home in Mexico with his Mexican mother and American father, attending the American School in Mexico City, the Universidad Anahuac for his Bachelor’s (where he is currently on the faculty), and now at Rice University in Texas for his M.B.A., Larry navigated between the American and Mexican cultures all his life. His extensive experience in business and in dealing with government officials make him a natural to understand the cultural, political, and commercial bilateral relations between the two countries. His deep commitment to promote and improve the ties that bind him also bind us, the members of this Society. Under Larry’s leadership, AmSoc has been growing and moving in significant directions, making these last years banner ones. With what is already in the works, we can expect an even more dynamic and burgeoning organization. The recently created corporate councils, the exponential growth in AmSoc’s involvement in the not for profit sector, expansion into the rest of the Latin American region all bode well for exciting next phase for The American Society of Mexico.

Honorary President 

Ken Salazar, U.S. Ambassador to Mexico was sworn in as United States Ambassador to Mexico on September 2, 2021.

In 2009, President Obama nominated Mr. Salazar to serve as Secretary of Interior where he had a lead role on the Obama-Biden agenda on energy and climate, the nation’s conservation agenda including America’s Great Outdoors, and Indian Country. Ambassador Salazar has been a lifelong fighter for civil rights and the inclusion of Latinos in the American dream.

In 1998, Mr. Salazar was elected as Colorado Attorney General and became the first Latino ever elected to statewide office in Colorado. He was reelected as Attorney General in 2002. In 2004, Attorney General Salazar was elected to the United States Senate for Colorado becoming the first Latino democrat to be elected to the United States Senate since 1972.

Ambassador Salazar has been admitted to practice law in state and federal courts, including the United States Supreme Court.

Mr. Salazar is Honorary President of The American Society of Mexico.

Councils

Corporate American Advisory Council  
This special group includes the leaders of 25 foremost American companies and serves as a sounding board for American interests in Mexico, and an excellent exchange channel for companies that face similar challenges.

Leadership of Corporate American Advisory Council 
Co-Chair, Francisco Garza, President & General Director, GM Mexico 

Co-Chair, Fernanda Guarro, President & Managing Director, 3M Mexico

Council of Latin America Leaders 
This select group of leaders of the Latin American divisions of American companies was formed to advance the interests of American businesses throughout the region. In order to represent a broad spectrum of companies, each participant of the Council is from a different industry.

Leadership of Council of Latin America Leaders  
Co-Chair, Manuel Macedo, President, Honeywell Latin America

Co-Chair, Gustavo Tella, Head of Latin America S&P Global Ratings

Committees 
The American Society of Mexico consists of five main committees that carry out a variety of activities that serve the American community in Mexico, fostering cultural, business, philanthropic and civic ties.

Organizations Steering Group (OSG-AmSoc) 
The governing body and operating arm of the Organizations Committee of The American Society of Mexico, is made up mostly of directors of organizations, as well as professional consultants and volunteers in the philanthropic field, who contribute their time to: help the organizations of our network achieve their mission, help the community through those organizations.

Leadership of OSG-AmSoc 
Vivian Bardavid - Member of the Board & Chair Organizations Steering Group. Founder and President Manhattan Group

Public Affairs Task Force (PATF-AmSoc) 
The PATF is a coordinate and optimal team with high experience, its aim is to manage the public affairs that concern to government relations, charitable organizations, politics, commerce associations, business groups and communications.

Leadership of PATF-AmSoc 
Patricia González -  Chair, Public Affairs Task Force & Legacy Partner at PwC

Julio Portales - Co-Chair, Public Affairs Task Force. Counsellor & Vice President, Constellation Brands. Mexico

Events 
Events and image committee join efforts to construct an appropriate way to reach our American community interests to attend the main topics at the moment. The making of a diversity of events helps us to reach a higher level of audience.

Leadership of Events Committee 
Patricia Kelly - Chair, Events Committee, Director of International Cultural & Public Relations at Club de Industriales

Editorial

Leadership of Editorial Committee 
Alejandro Sámano - Chair, Editorial Committee. Partner, CONTACTA Consultores. Mexico

Memberships 
The Membership Committee main task is to attract and make join new members to the AmSoc, following a specific strategy to maintain the members requirements in the correct level. The committee focus on developing the best strategies to get involved and to approach to the American community looking for an increase in members.

Leadership of Memberships Committee 
Benjamin Podoswa, Chair, Membership Committee & General Director at Sección Amarilla/AND

Board

The Association of American Clubs  
The Association of American Clubs (AAC) is an alliance of American clubs, societies, and organizations worldwide that forms an international network providing an open forum for the exchange of institutional practices

The American Society of Mexico is a founding member of The Association of American Clubs (AAC) through a direct initiative formalized by Jürgen Abel, its founder and President of The American International Society in Hamburg, Germany during his visit to Mexico City, Mexico in the early 2000's

References

American diaspora in Mexico